Beyond the Bloodhounds is the debut studio album by American singer-songwriter Adia Victoria. It was released in May 2016 under Atlantic Records.

Track listing

References

2016 albums
Atlantic Records albums
Gothic country albums